The 2016 Panda Cup was the third edition of Panda Cup, an under-19 association football competition. The tournament was hosted in Chengdu between 15 and 19 June 2016. Players born on or after 1 January 1997 are eligible to compete in the tournament.

Participating teams

Venues

Standings

Matches
All times are China Standard Time (UTC+08:00)

Goalscorers
4 goals
 Josip Špoljarić

2 goals
 Takeru Kishimoto

1 goal

 Andrija Balić
 Marijan Čabraja
 Dominik Martinović 
 Filip Uremović
 Jan Kuchta
 Badocha Ondřej
 Jan Šrain
 Ritsu Doan
 Yuto Iwasaki
 Koki Ogawa
 Koki Sugimori
 Itsuki Urata

References

2016 in association football
2016 in Chinese football
June 2016 sports events in China
International association football competitions hosted by China